Deh-e Veys Aqa (also Romanized as Deh-e Veys Āqā; also known as Veys Āqā Kandī) is a village in Mokriyan-e Shomali Rural District, in the Central District of Miandoab County, West Azerbaijan Province, Iran. At the 2006 census, its population was 663, in 132 families.

References 

Populated places in Miandoab County